Premiership Rugby, officially known as Gallagher Premiership Rugby, or the Gallagher Premiership for sponsorship reasons, is an English professional rugby union competition, consisting of 11 clubs, and is the top division of the English rugby union system.

Premiership clubs qualify for Europe's two main club competitions, the European Rugby Champions Cup and the European Rugby Challenge Cup. The winner of the second division, the RFU Championship is promoted to the Premiership and until 2020, the team finishing at the bottom of the Premiership each season was relegated to the Championship. The competition is regarded as one of the three top-level professional leagues in the Northern and Western Hemispheres, along with the Top 14 in France, and the cross-border United Rugby Championship for teams from Scotland, Wales, Ireland, Italy and South Africa.

The competition has been played since 1987, and has evolved into the current Premiership system. The current champions are Leicester Tigers. The most recently promoted side are Saracens, who returned to the top flight in 2021.

History

Beginnings: English domestic rugby union until 1972
The governing body of rugby union in England, the Rugby Football Union (RFU), long resisted leagues as it was believed that the introduction of leagues would increase 'dirty' play and put pressure on clubs to pay their players (thereby contravening the amateur ethos). Instead, clubs arranged their own fixtures and had traditional games. The only organised tournaments were the County Cups and County Championship – the former played by clubs and the latter by County representative teams. The Daily Telegraph and a few local newspapers – such as the Yorkshire Post – compiled 'pennants' based on teams' performances, but as the strength of fixture lists varied, it was at best an estimate of a team's performance throughout a season.

1972–1995: Leagues and cups
In 1972 the RFU sanctioned a national knock-out cup – the RFU Club Competition, the predecessor to the Anglo-Welsh Cup – followed first by regional merit tables and then, in the mid-1980s, by national merit tables. One of the casualties of the move to competitive leagues was the loss of some traditional games as the new fixture lists didn't allow time for all of them.

The league system has evolved since its start in 1987 when the Courage Leagues were formed – a league pyramid with roughly 1,000 clubs playing in 108 leagues, each with promotion and relegation.

In the first season, clubs were expected to arrange the fixtures on mutually convenient dates. The clubs involved were Bath, Bristol, Coventry, Gloucester, Harlequins, Leicester, Moseley, Nottingham, Orrell, Sale, Wasps and Waterloo. That first season was an unqualified success, with clubs in the upper echelons of the national leagues reporting increased crowds, interest from both local backers and national companies, and higher skill levels among players exposed to regular competition. The fears that leagues would lead to greater violence on the field proved largely unfounded.

By the next season, the RFU allocated fixed Saturdays to the league season, removing the clubs' responsibility for scheduling matches. There was no home and away structure to the leagues in those early seasons, as sides played one another only once.

Initially two teams, Bath and Leicester, proved to be head and shoulders above the rest in the Courage League, and between them dominated the top of the table.

In 1994 the league structure expanded to include a full rota of home and away matches for the first time. The 1994–95 season was the first to be shown live on Sky Sports, a relationship which continued until the 2013–14 season when BT Sport acquired the exclusive rights.

1996: The dawn of professional rugby union
The league turned professional for the 1996–97 season when the first winners were Wasps, joining Bath and Leicester as the only champions in the league's first decade. Clubs like Saracens, Newcastle and Northampton were able to attract wealthy benefactors, but the professional era also had its casualties, as clubs like West Hartlepool, Richmond and London Scottish were forced into administration when their backers pulled out.

2000–2002: Premiership, Championship and playoffs
The start of the 2000–01 season brought with it a re-vamping of the season structure. In 2000–2001 an 8-team playoff (the Championship) was introduced. However, the team finishing top of the table at the end of the regular season was still considered English champions ("Premiership title").

Halfway through the 2001–02 season, with Leicester odds-on to win their fourth title in succession, it was controversially decided that the winners of the 8-team playoff would be crowned English champions. There was an outcry from fans and this proposal was dropped.

2003–2014: The ascendancy of the playoffs
From the beginning of the 2002–03 season, a new playoff format was introduced to replace the 8-team Championship. The format required the first-placed team in the league to play the winner of a match between the second- and third-placed teams. Critically, the winner of this game (the Premiership Final) would be recognised as English champions. Although Gloucester won the league by a clear margin, they then faced a three-week wait until the final. Having lost their momentum, they were beaten by second-placed Wasps (who had defeated third-placed Northampton) in the play-offs. The playoff structure was reformatted in the 2005–06 season in which the first-placed team would play the fourth placed team in a semi-final (a Shaughnessy playoff).

Since the implementation of the playoff system, only five teams have won both the regular season and playoffs in the same year: Leicester twice in 2000–01 (the first year of the playoffs), 2008–09, 2009–10 and 2021-22 Sale Sharks in 2005–06, Harlequins in 2011–12, Saracens in 2015–16 and Exeter in 2019–20.

Of all the Premiership teams, Wasps have made a reputation for playing the competition format to perfection, peaking at the right time to be crowned English Champions in 2003, 2004, 2005 and 2008. Wasps did not lead the league standings at the end of the season in any of these years. Conversely, Gloucester have garnered an unfortunate reputation for leading the table at the end of the regular season, only to fall short of winning the Premiership title, losing finals in 2003, 2007, and 2008. Gloucester's single victory in the playoffs, in 2002, occurred when league leaders Leicester were still considered English champions, meaning Gloucester's Championship victory was considered secondary.

The 2011–12 season saw Harlequins add their name to the trophy on their first attempt, winning 30–23 against the nine-times champions Leicester. Leicester would have to wait until 2012–13 for their 10th championship, where they defeated Northampton in the final.

The 2013–14 Aviva Premiership season saw Northampton become the 8th different team to win the trophy. This was achieved when they defeated Leicester Tigers in the semi-final 21–20, thus denying Leicester a 10th Consecutive Final. In the final, they defeated Saracens 20–24 with a try in the last minute of extra time to win the 2013–14 Aviva Premiership.

2014–2018: US initiatives
With the future of the Heineken Cup uncertain beyond 2013–14, due to a row between England's Premiership Rugby Limited and France's LNR on one side and the sport's governing bodies on the other, Premiership Rugby Limited explored several moves toward expanding its brand into the United States. In May 2013, Premiership Rugby Limited and U.S.-based RugbyLaw entered into a plan by which the two organisations were to help back a proposed U.S. professional league that could have begun play as early as 2014. The first phase of the plan was to involve two preseason exhibitions featuring an "American Barbarians" side that would combine international veterans and young American talent. The "Barbarians" were intended to play matches in August 2013 in the U.S. and London, but those plans fell through, and the matches were indefinitely delayed.

In August 2013, Leicester Tigers chairman Peter Tom confirmed that Premiership Rugby Limited had discussed the possibility of bringing select Premiership matches to the US. The first match played in the USA was on 12 March 2016 when London Irish were defeated by Saracens at the Red Bull Arena in the New York Metropolitan Area. This match was intended to be the first of a three-year deal which would have seen London Irish play one home match each season in the US, but their relegation from the Premiership at the end of the 2015–16 season scuttled that plan. A new deal was reached with American sports marketing company AEG in 2017 which was intended to see at least one Premiership match taken to the US for four seasons starting in 2017–18. The first match under the new deal was held on 16 September 2017, with Newcastle Falcons taking their home fixture against Saracens to the Talen Energy Stadium in the Philadelphia suburb of Chester, Pennsylvania. In 2018–19, although no match was scheduled to take place in the US, the round 6 match between Saracens and Harlequins was the first broadcast on network television in the US of a Premiership Rugby game. The game was shown live on NBC. In 2019–20, and 2020–21 once again no matches were scheduled to take place in the US.

2018 also saw a revamp of the league's secondary competition with the launch of the Premiership Rugby Shield.

2018–19: CVC Capital Partners investment
In December 2018 it was announced that the Luxembourg based investment advisory firm CVC Capital Partners had bought a 27% stake in Premiership Rugby in a deal worth £200m. A previous offer to purchase a 51% majority share was rejected. The money from the investment was planned to be used to improve facilities at clubs and grow the game globally.

2019–20: Salary Cap investigation into Saracens (SALARYCENS)
In March 2019, allegations emerged that Saracens may have broken the league's salary cap. In June, Premiership Rugby announced that they would investigate the allegations.  In November 2019, Saracens were found to have been in breach of the salary cap regulations due to failure to disclose player payments in the 2016–17, 2017–18 and 2018–19 seasons, which would have taken them over the senior player cap. They were handed a 35-point deduction for the 2019–20 season and fined £5.3 million. The judgement found that Saracens had been reckless in entering into the arrangements with players without disclosing them to Premiership Rugby.

On 18 January 2020, Premiership Rugby announced that Saracens would be relegated to the RFU Championship for the 2020–21 season.  Premiership Rugby CEO Darren Childs said this punishment was due to Saracens lack of cooperation in a mid-season audit to prove compliance in the 2019–20 season.

On 23 January 2020, Lord Dyson's full report into Saracens' spending was published, it revealed that Saracens had overspent the salary cap by £1.1m in 2016–17, £98,000 in 2017-18 and £906,000 in 2018–19.  These included £923,947.63 of property investments between Nigel Wray and three unnamed Saracens players. It also included Saracens claim that the Salary Cap was unenforceable under competition law, this defence was rejected.  On 28 January 2020, Premiership Rugby applied a further 70 point deduction for the 2019–20 season to ensure Saracens would finish bottom of the league table.

2020–2024: Effects of the COVID-19 pandemic and expansion of the league. 
The COVID-19 pandemic disrupted all elite sports in England in spring 2020. The RFU initially suspended both the Premiership and Championship before eventually cancelling the Championship season. Newcastle Falcons, who topped the Championship table at the time of the season's premature end were promoted based on their playing record and would replace Saracens in the Premiership the following season.

The 2019–20 Premiership Rugby season recommenced on 14 August and the final was held 24 October 2020.

The disruption of the 2019–20 season meant the 2020–21 season commenced 10 weeks late on 20 November 2020 and ran over a reduced timeframe of 32 weeks (down from 42).

The financial impact of the pandemic also caused the salary cap to be temporarily reduced for a maximum of 3 seasons from the 2021–22 season.

A moratorium on relegation was also approved in February 2021, meaning no teams would be relegated as a potential consequence of another team receiving more points due to games cancelled because of COVID-19. With this news it was also confirmed that the league's minimum standards criteria for promotion would be reviewed as would league structure from 2021–22. The new structure extended the moratorium on relegation for a further two-years. A playoff between the top team in the Championship and the bottom team in the Premiership is also introduced in the 2023–24 season.

Financial Problems and Administration (2022)

On 17 October 2022, Wasps went into administration, and were suspended from the league.
Their upcoming fixture against Sale Sharks on 18 October, was also cancelled.
On 28 October, it was confirmed that Wasps would be relegated to the championship, and any remaining fixtures expunged.

Clubs

Current clubs 

The Premiership began the current 2022–23 season with 13 clubs, but both Wasps Rugby and Worcester Warriors were removed from the league, and automatically relegated, after going into administration.

 Note: Capacity listed for rugby union games may differ from official stadium capacity

All time 

A total of 28 clubs have been involved in the top-flight since the league's inception in the 1987–88 season. The most recent club to make its debut in the Premiership was London Welsh, which made their top flight debut in 2012–13.

Three clubs — Bath, Gloucester and Leicester Tigers — have appeared in every season to date. Having come bottom of the table in the 2021/22 season Bath would have been relegated to the championship had it not been for the moratorium on relegation. Harlequins have only missed the 2005–06 season.  Six other clubs have appeared in at least 20 seasons — Saracens, Northampton Saints, Sale Sharks, London Irish, Bristol Bears and Newcastle Falcons. The financial insolvency, expulsion and automatic relegation of Wasps during the 2022–23 season means their record of being ever-present effectively ended at the end of the 2021–22 season.

Coventry, Liverpool St Helens, Moseley, Nottingham, Rosslyn Park, Rugby and Waterloo only appeared during the amateur era, whereas Exeter Chiefs, Leeds Tykes, London Welsh, Richmond, Rotherham Titans and Worcester Warriors have only appeared during the professional era.

Below, the 2022–23 clubs are listed in bold; ever-present clubs are listed in bold italics. Years listed are the calendar years in which the seasons ended. All current teams will remain in the league until at least 2024.

Sponsorship

Structure

Referees 

Referees in the Premiership are selected from the RFU's Professional Referee Unit. The Professional Referee Unit consists of 15 referees with match appointments decided by PRU management team of ex-international referees Ed Morrison, Brian Campsall and Tony Spreadbury.

List of Premiership Referees

Source:

Wayne Barnes
Matthew Carley
Sara Cox 
Karl Dickson
Tom Foley
Simon Harding
Andrew Jackson
Greg MacDonald
Craig Maxwell-Keys
John Meredith
Luke Pearce
Dean Richards
Christophe Ridley
Ian Tempest 
Tim Wigglesworth

They are supported by a large team of assistant referees.

League season 
The Premiership Rugby league season typically runs from September to June and comprises 26 rounds of matches, with each club playing each other home and away. Each team will receive two bye weeks. The results of the matches contribute points to the league as follows: 
4 points are awarded for a win
2 points are awarded for a draw
0 points are awarded for a loss, however
1 losing (bonus) point is awarded to a team that loses a match by 7 points or fewer
1 additional (bonus) point is awarded to a team scoring 4 tries or more in a match
Since the restart of the 2019–20 season, scheduled fixtures which are cancelled because of a COVID-19 outbreak in one of the competing teams will have their outcome and points allocation decided by a Premiership Rugby panel. As of the start of the 2021–22 season, if the fixture cannot be rescheduled, it is recorded as a 0–0 draw. In this situation, if one team would have been able to fulfill the fixture, they will be awarded 4 points, while the team unable to field a matchday squad due to a COVID-19 outbreak will be given 2 points – otherwise, if both teams are impacted by COVID-19, they will each receive 2 points for the affected fixture.

Playoffs 
Following the completion of the regular season, the top 4 teams enter the playoffs, which are held in June. The top two teams receive home advantage, the league leaders hosting the 4th ranked team, and the 2nd place team hosting the 3rd place team. The winners of these semi-finals progress to the final, held at Twickenham Stadium, with the winner of the final being crowned champions.

Promotion and relegation 
Admittance to the Premiership, which is Level 1 of the men's 106-league English rugby union system, is achieved through a system of promotion and relegation between the Premiership and the RFU Championship. Originally this meant a season-winning Championship club was promoted, replacing the lowest placed Premiership club which was relegated (since 2021 promotion continues but no Level 1 club has been relegated). 

Promotion from the Championship is subject to the Minimum Standards Criteria. If a promotion-winning team does not meet these standards then there is no promotion. In the 2011–12 season London Welsh won promotion from the Championship but were initially denied promotion under the criteria, reprieving Newcastle Falcons from relegation. However London Welsh were found eligible on appeal and Newcastle were relegated.

Relegation change and new regulations
As a result of the COVID-19 pandemic, a moratorium was approved in February 2021 for a halt on top-flight clubs being relegated from the Premiership beginning that season. As promotion from the Championship would not be stopped, this meant the Premiership would expand to 13 teams in the following year. 

The moratorium was extended by an additional two seasons in June 2021. New regulations would also include a moratorium on promotion from the Championship in the same season had the Premiership expanded to 14 teams and introduce a play-off between the bottom placed Premiership Club and top placed Championship club in 2023–24. New minimum standards criteria were announced in September 2022, confirming that promotion from the championship was still due to take place in 2023.

The Premiership could have expanded again to 14 teams from 2022–23 but the league returned to 12 teams on 6 October 2022 when Worcester Warriors were expelled from the league for the season after entering administration due to financial problems. Despite trying to find a buyer, the club was wound up in February 2023.
On 17 October 2022, Wasps became the second Premiership club to enter administration that season. The club was automatically relegated from the Premiership, with their remaining games cancelled and all results expunged.

European competition qualification 
The top seven teams qualify for the following season's European Rugby Champions Cup. The eighth champions cup place is awarded to either the winner of the Challenge Cup or the team placed eighth. Teams placed 8-13th that do not qualify for the Champions Cup play in the Challenge Cup.

Champions 
Between 1987 and 2002, the team at the top of the league was crowned English champions. Since 2002–03, the winner of the league has been determined by a Premiership Final, which takes place at Twickenham and consists of two rounds of knock-out play amongst the top four teams. This change was originally considered controversial, particular when Wasps won four of the first six play-off finals without ever topping the regular season table, with Sale the only team to both top the table and win the Premiership final in that period. Over time, the play-off structures have bedded in, but as of 2022 only seven teams across twenty seasons have managed to both top the regular season table and proceed to win the Premiership final. 

In most seasons, at least one team has been relegated at the end of the season, although in 1995–96, there was no relegation to allow division expansion, and in 2001–02, Leeds were given a reprieve because the Division One champions did not have a suitable ground to allow promotion. Relegation was also suspended between 2020–21 and 2022–23 to allow further expansion, although Wasps and Worcester will both be relegated for going into administration at the end of the 2022-23 season.

Summary of winners

Player records 

All records relate to the 1997–98 season onward when National League One was re-launched as the Premiership.

Source: . Bold italics denote players active in the 2022–23 Premiership.

Appearances

Points

Tries

Awards

Attendances

Salary cap 
The English Premiership operates a salary cap, set by the Premiership Rugby Board, specifying the money a club can spend on the player salaries of its squad per season. Until the 2024–25 season, the base cap is £5 million, with an "academy credit" of up to £600,000 (£100,000 per player for up to six players).

A club may use the academy credit on a player that: (i) joined the club before his 18th birthday; (ii) is under age 24 at the start of the season; and (iii) earns a salary of more than £50,000. Under the credit scheme, the first £100,000 of a qualifying player's salary is not counted against the cap.

Exclusions 
Since the 2022–23 season, each club has been allowed to exclude one player from the cap calculations, a decrease from two in prior seasons. An exception is made for any team which had two excluded players currently under contract. Both players remain excluded until the first of their contracts expire.

The "excluded player" slot can be filled by any player on a team's current roster who meets any of the following criteria:
 Played with his Premiership club for at least two full seasons before he was nominated as an excluded player.
 Played with his Premiership club for the full season before being nominated as an excluded player, after having played outside the Premiership.
 Played outside the Premiership in the season before he was nominated.

Media coverage 
In the United Kingdom, the primary rights are currently held by BT Sport under a new deal signed on 18 December 2020 replacing former deals signed on 16 March 2015 and 12 September 2012. The new deal sees BT broadcast up to 80 live matches per season from both Premiership Rugby and the Premiership Rugby Cup until the end of the 2023–24 season along with extended highlights of all matches and midweek programming. Secondary UK rights are held by ITV who simulcast 7 matches live on a free-to-air basis, including the final. Their coverage uses a different presenting and commentary team to BT, and they also show a weekly highlights programme until the end of the 2023–24 season. In Australia the Premiership is available on beIN Sports. In the United States, the Premiership is available on NBC Sports since spring 2016. It has also been broadcast in China since 2017.

Talksport and BBC Radio 5 Live, along with various BBC Local Radio stations broadcast commentary and magazine programming.

See also 
Top 14, French equivalent of the Premiership, second of the three major northern hemisphere leagues.
United Rugby Championship, cross-border equivalent of the Premiership, third of the three major northern hemisphere leagues.
English rugby union system
List of English rugby union teams
Premiership Rugby Cup
Anglo-Welsh Cup (superseded by the Premiership Rugby Cup)
Premiership Rugby Shield
RFU Championship, second tier of English club rugby, from which teams are promoted from, and into which teams are relegated from, the Premiership.
European Professional Club Rugby
European Rugby Champions Cup
European Rugby Challenge Cup
Premiership Rugby Sevens Series
List of attendance figures at domestic professional sports leagues
List of English rugby union stadiums by capacity
List of professional sports teams in the United Kingdom

References

Notes

External links 

Guinness Premiership Rugby Week
English rugby union news BBC Sport
All Time Premiership Records

 
National rugby union premier leagues
Organisations based in the City of Westminster
Professional sports leagues in England
Professional sports leagues in the United Kingdom
1
Sport in the City of Westminster
Sports leagues established in 1987
1987 establishments in England